Sage Clifton Read Canaday (born November 14, 1985) is an American long-distance runner and ultramarathoner.

Running career

High school and collegiate
Canaday attended Newberg High School in Newberg, Oregon, where he ran track and cross country. He then went on to run for Cornell University in Ithaca, New York, and at 21 was the youngest qualifier and runner at the 2008 U.S. Olympic Trials marathon, held in New York City on the same weekend as the 2007 New York City Marathon, and went on to win the Ivy League 10,000 meter championship in 2008. Canaday graduated from Cornell in 2009 with a Bachelor of Science in Design.

Professional
After graduating from Cornell, Canaday began his professional running career as a marathoner for the Hansons-Brooks Distance Project, sponsored by Brooks Sports. While with Hansons-Brooks, Canaday set personal bests in both the half marathon (1:04:32 at the 2011 Rock 'n’ Roll Mardi Gras half marathon) and marathon (2:16:52 at the 2011 Rock 'n' Roll San Diego Marathon *Not Legal worldathletics.org). He qualified again for the Olympic Trials marathon, where he finished 43rd in 2:18:24 in 2012, but left Hansons-Brooks that February to pursue a career as an ultramarathoner.

Canaday wrote a book titled Running For The Hansons about his experience with Hansons-Brooks, published in 2011.

Canaday placed second at his debut ultramarathon in March after running off course for several minutes in the Chuckanut 50k in Bellingham, Washington, and won the USA Track & Field (USATF) Mountain Running Championship at the Mount Washington Road Race in June. That same year, he moved from the Hansons-Brooks base of Rochester Hills, Michigan to Boulder, Colorado, a major center for endurance athletes, and in October announced a sponsorship deal with SCOTT Sports, which replaced Brooks as his primary sponsor. Canaday's streak of ultramarathon success continued into 2013, when he won the USATF 100K Trail Championship in Bandera, Texas, the Speedgoat 50K, and Lake Sonoma 50, all in course records, as well as the Cayuga Trails 50 in Ithaca, New York and the 100K race at the Tarawera Ultramarathon in New Zealand.

In January 2014, Canaday announced a new primary sponsor, Hoka One One, a French running shoe company known for its "maximalist," highly cushioned shoes. Wearing Hoka One One shoes that year, Canaday replicated his victories at Tarawera and Speedgoat and also won the Pikes Peak Ascent in August, en route to winning the prestigious The North Face Endurance Challenge 50 mile race in December.

In 2015, Canaday re-focused on the marathon distance with the goal of qualifying for the 2016 Olympic Trials marathon. In March, he was 8th in the USATF marathon championship among American runners at the Los Angeles Marathon, in which he placed 12th overall, and was 16th overall at the Boston Marathon in April, though he fell short of an Olympic Trials qualifying time in both races. Canaday made a brief summer return to ultramarathoning for the Comrades Marathon, where he placed 15th, and Speedgoat, which he again won, before competing in the Ultra-Trail du Mont-Blanc–his first race of 100 miles–in late August, which he was forced to drop out of due to a knee injury. He would make two more Olympic Trials marathon qualifying attempts, at the California International Marathon in December and the Houston Marathon in January 2016, but failed to meet the qualifying standard of 2:19:00 before the January 17, 2016 deadline, with a season best time of 2:19:12 on a windy day at the Boston Marathon where he was 16th place overall.

He continued his ultra-marathon career in 2016, including his second 100-mile race and first finish at the distance, placing 11th at the Western States Endurance Run, having at one point been second and ahead of record course pace.

Personal bests

Achievements

Coaching
Canaday is self-coached and very public with his training, posting most of his workouts on the activity-tracking website Strava. 

He and his girlfriend, fellow ultramarathoner Sandi Nypaver, are the owners and founders of Higher Running, an online running coaching website which markets training plans and e-books for the running community. 

Canaday is an outspoken opponent of performance-enhancing drug use and has professed support for a zero-tolerance policy for PED users in endurance sports.

Personal life
Canaday was raised a vegetarian and describes his current diet as "nearly vegan," citing the environmental and health benefits of a plant-based, high-carbohydrate diet. He admits to regular beer-drinking and is sponsored by the Boulder-based Avery Brewing Company.

Internet videos
Canaday is the owner of the YouTube channel Vo2maxProductions, where he posts a mix of training videos, running gear reviews, race recaps, and "training talks", all self-produced. He often releases several videos a week. As of January 2023, the channel has over 224,000 subscribers and more than 41,000,000 views.

References

External links
 Sage Canaday's personal website
 Sage Running
 On The Trail with Sage Canaday
 Vo2max Productions - YouTube
 Sage Canaday Fan Page - Facebook

1985 births
Living people
American male long-distance runners
American male marathon runners
American male ultramarathon runners
Cornell Big Red men's track and field athletes
People from Newberg, Oregon
Sportspeople from Oregon
American sky runners
World Long Distance Mountain Running Championships winners